Riachão (Portuguese ) is a village near São Bento in Paraíba state, Brazil. With 742 inhabitants it is the largest settlement in the city.

Etymology 
Riachão (large stream). The Riachão name was given because of a stream that has the village out to the border of Paraíba and Rio Grande do Norte and in times of floods is filled to not exceed transport in any way.

References

Populated places in Paraíba